Pathein Airport  is an airport in Pathein, Myanmar.

Airlines and destinations

References

Airports in Myanmar